Sri D. Subbaramaiah (1904 – 16 August 1986) was a Carnatic vocalist from Karnataka.

Personal life 

Sri D. Subbaramaiah was born in 1904 in Bangalore and lived there his entire life.

Career 
He was a famous Carnatic vocalist, guru, and also a scholar in Sanskrit, Kannada, and English. .

He is said to be one of the first vocalists to cut a successful record for HMV.

Sri D. Subbaramaiah founded the Karnataka College of Music in 1933 and imparted methodical training to music students. It is said to be the first ever institutions in Karnataka exclusively for teaching music and the first music college to be recognized and aided by the Government 
.

He participated prominently in several music conferences and presided over the music conference in Bidaram Krishnappa’s Prasanna Seetharama Mandiram, Mysore, in 1960. He also took part in various music related discussions and examination boards all over the country. He also sang in the courts of Mysore King Krishnaraja Wodeyar IV

Throughout his  career spanning over six decades, he received many awards, titles, and accolades including the Karnataka State Sangita Nataka Academy award in 1963. In recognition for his contributions to Carnatic music, he was awarded the prestigious titles of 'Ganakalasindhu', 'Sangeet Vidwan', 'Ganakalakushala', and 'Nadasudhanidhi'. Besides receiving honors and felicitations in Karnataka, he was also honoured and felicitated in neighboring states such as Andhra Pradesh.

Sri D. Subbaramaiah is often remembered during various Carnatic music festivals and similar occasions. He died on 16 August 1986.

References

Male Carnatic singers
Carnatic singers
Singers from Bangalore
Indian music educators
20th-century Indian male classical singers
1904 births
1986 deaths